Minnesota State Highway 73 (MN 73) is a  highway in northeast Minnesota, which runs from its interchange with Interstate Highway 35 in Moose Lake and continues north to its northern terminus at its intersection with U.S. Highway 53 in Field Township near Cook and Orr.

Route description
Highway 73 serves as a north–south route in northeast Minnesota between Moose Lake, Kettle River, Cromwell, Floodwood, Hibbing, and Chisholm.

The roadway passes through the Sturgeon River State Forest and the Superior National Forest, both north of Chisholm, in Saint Louis County.

The route is legally defined as Legislative Route 163 in the Minnesota Statutes. It is not marked with this number.

History
Highway 73 was authorized in 1933, and was originally numbered "Minnesota 63" until that U.S. route number was added elsewhere in Minnesota.

The route was marked as "Minnesota 73" by 1935.

In 1940, the route was mostly gravel south of Hibbing.  The last segments paved in the mid-1950s were south of Hibbing.

The Highway 73 designation was extended south through Moose Lake, partially along old U.S. 61, to Interstate 35 in the mid-1970s.

Major intersections

References

073
Transportation in Carlton County, Minnesota
Transportation in St. Louis County, Minnesota
U.S. Route 61